Sŏngch'ŏn County is a kun (county) in South P'yŏngan, North Korea.

Administrative divisions
Sŏngch'ŏn county is divided into 1 ŭp (town), 3 rodongjagu (workers' districts) and 20 ri (villages):

Transportation
Sŏngch'ŏn county is served by the P'yŏngdŏk and P'yŏngra lines of the Korean State Railway.

References

External links
  Map of Pyongan provinces
  Detailed map

Counties of South Pyongan